Abkhazia ( Apsny,  Apkhazeti or Abkhazeti,  Abkhazia) is a de facto independent, partially recognised country lying on the eastern coast of the Black Sea, its southern border. It is bordered by Russia to the north, and Georgia to the east recognised by Russia, Nicaragua, Venezuela, and the de facto independent republics of South Ossetia and Transnistria, in which context it is referred to as the Republic of Abkhazia with Sukhumi as its capital.

Religion

The population (including all ethnic groups) of Abkhazia are majority Orthodox Christians and Sunni Muslims. Most of the ethnic Armenians living in Abkhazia belong to the Armenian Apostolic Church. However, most of the people who declare themselves Christian or Muslim do not attend religious services. There is also a very small number of Jews, Jehovah's Witnesses and the followers of new religions. The Jehovah's Witnesses organization has officially been banned since 1995, though the decree is not currently enforced.

According to the constitutions of Georgia, Autonomous Republic of Abkhazia and de facto Republic of Abkhazia the adherents of all religions (as well as atheists) have equal rights before the law.

Abkhazia is recognized by the Eastern Orthodox world as a canonical territory of the Georgian Orthodox Church, which has been unable to operate in the region since the War in Abkhazia. Currently, the religious affairs of local Orthodox Christian community is run by the self-imposed "Eparchy of Abkhazia" under significant influence of the Russian Orthodox Church.

Education

Until 19th century young people from Abkhazia usually received their education mainly at religious schools (Muslims at Madrasas and Christians at Seminaries), although a small number of children from wealthy families had opportunity to travel to foreign countries for education. The first modern educational institutions (both schools and colleges) in Abkhazia were established in the late 19th-early 20th century and rapidly grew until the second half of the 20th century. 

Children in Abkhazia begin their education at the age of 6, and graduate at 17. Official estimates put the total number of school children at about 28,000 who are  enrolled into 155 schools. Russian is taught in all schools.

By the middle of the 20th century, Sukhumi became a home for largest educational institutions (both higher education institutions and Technical Vocational Education and Training (TVET) colleges) and largest students' community in Abkhazia. For example, the number of college students grew from few dozens in the 1920s to several thousands in the 1980s.

According to the official statistical data, Abkhazia has 12 TVET colleges (as of 2019, est.) providing education and vocational training to youth mostly in the capital city, though there are several colleges in all major district centers. Independent international assessments suggest that these colleges train in about 20 different specialties attracting between 1200 and 1500 young people annually (aged between 16 and 29) (as of 2019, est.).  The largest colleges are as follows:

Abkhaz Multiindustrial College (1959) (from 1959 to 1999 - Sukhumi Trade and Culinary School),

Sukhumi State College (1904) (from 1904 to 1921 - Sukhumi Real School; from 1921 to 1999 - Sukhumi Industrial Technical School),

Sukhumi Art College (1935),

Sukhum Medical College (1931)

Higher education in Abkhazia currently is represented by one university, Abkhazian State University, which has a special status in the education system in Abkhazia and it manages its own budget. Between 2000 and 2020, a small number of school graduates from Abkhazia have received higher education in other countries under different scholarship programs and themes, covering bachelor, master and PhD education. 

Abkhaz State University (1979), has its own campus which is a home for 42 departments organized into 8 faculties providing education to about 3300 students (as of 2019, est.).

Sport

Football was the most popular sport in Abkhazia during Soviet times. The main club of the republic, Dinamo Sukhumi, played mostly in the lower leagues of Soviet football. However, Abkhazia produced several football talents who played in the top Georgian team FC Dinamo Tbilisi and in other Soviet teams. Natives of Abkhazia Vitaly Daraselia, Nikita (Mkrtych) Simonian, Avtandil Gogoberidze, Niyazbey Dzyapshipa, Giorgi Gavasheli, Temuri Ketsbaia and Akhrik Tsveiba were among the most prominent footballers of the Soviet Union. In 2016 Abkhazia hosted and won the ConIFA World Football Cup.

The majority of Abkhazia's population have Russian citizenship so Abkhazian sportsmen participate in international competitions as Russian citizens. They had their biggest successes in boxing (2005 European Champion David Arshba; 2006 Russian Championship prize-winner Aslan Akhba) and freestyle wrestling (2006 American Airlines Freestyle Wrestling Tournament winner Denis Tsargush).

National Basketball Team of Abkhazia played its first game with the Turkish Republic of Northern Cyprus Basketball team on 27 May 2015, which Abkhaz team won by 76-59.  Abkhaz basketball team "Apsny" also plays in the Russian Basketball League's Third-Tier in Krasnodar Krai.

Since early 2000 tennis has become increasingly popular among school age children in Abkhazia. Several tennis players from Sukhumi participated as the national competitions in Russia and played at major international competitions under the Russian flag. For example, tennis player Alen Avidzba participated at the Davis Cup in 2016  and Amina Anshba won a silver medal at an international tournament in Turkey in 2017. In fact, according to the official information from the Tennis portal.ru the highest career achievement of Amina Anshba was 355th place in the ranking among women in 2020

Museums 
Museums in Abkhazia include the following.

See also

 Abkhaz literature
 Media in Abkhazia

References

External links
 Example of Abkhaz language
 Abkhazian culture